Michael Kennefick (14 July 1924 – 20 December 1984) was an Irish hurler who played as a left wing-forward at senior level for the Cork county team.

Kennefick joined the team during the 1942 championship and was a regular member of the starting fifteen until his forced retirement due to injury during the 1944 championship. During that time he won two All-Ireland medals and two Munster medals. Kennefick captained Cork to the All-Ireland title in 1943.

At club level Kennefick was a two-time county club championship medalist with St Finbarr's.

His father, Dan Kennefick, also played hurling for Cork.

Playing career

Club
Kennefick played his club hurling with St Finbarr's and had much success.

He first played for the famous "Barr's" club in the minor grade and collected three successive championship medals in that grade between 1939 and 1941.

In 1942 Kennefick played in his first senior county final with "the Barr's". Ballincollig, a team who had defeated nine-in-a-row hopefuls Glen Rovers in the semi-final, provided the opposition. St Finbarr's made no mistake and powered to a 5–7 to 2–2. It was Kennefick's first championship medal.

Both St Finbarr's and Ballincollig met in the championship decider again the following year. A 3–3 apiece draw, thanks to a late goal by Seán Condon, was the result on that occasion; however, St Finbarr's made no mistake in the replay and powered to a 7–9 to 1–1 victory. It was Kennefick's second and final championship medal.

Inter-county
Kennefick first came to prominence on the inter-county scene as a member of the Cork minor hurling team in 1941. He won a Munster medal that year following a 4–6 to 3–3 defeat of Tipperary. Kennefick later lined out in the All-Ireland decider against Kilkenny. A 5–2 to 2–2 score line gave Cork the victory and gave Kennefick an All-Ireland Minor Hurling Championship medal.

In 1942 Kennefick made his senior championship debut in a Munster semi-final defeat of Limerick. He won his first Munster that year as Tipp were downed by 4–15 to 4–1 in the subsequent provincial decider. The All-Ireland final was a replay of the previous year with Dublin providing the opposition once again. The game was a close affair with just a point separating the sides at the three-quarter stage. In the end Cork won comfortably enough by 2–14 to 3–4 and Kennefick collected his first All-Ireland medal.

Kennefick was just eighteen-years-old when he was appointed captain of the Cork team in 1943. A 2–13 to 3–8 defeat of Waterford that year gave him a second Munster medal. He later lined out in a second All-Ireland decider with Antrim becoming the first Ulster side to qualify for a final. Unfortunately, the occasion got to the Glensmen as Cork built up an unassailable 3–11 to 0–2 half-time lead. The final score of 5–16 to 0–4 gave Cork their second-ever hat-trick of All-Ireland titles while it also gave Kennefick a third All-Ireland medal and the honour of collecting the Liam MacCarthy Cup.

By this stage Kennefick had come to be regarded as something of a teenage prodigy, however, his story is one of a great "might-have-been".  In the first-round of the 1944 Munster series of games Kennefick's wrist was broken by Tipperary player James Ryan. The injury proved detrimental to his career as Kennefick never played for Cork again.

Inter-provincial
Kennefick also had the honour of being selected for Munster in the inter-provincial series of games. He made his debut with the province in 1943 and collected his sole Railway Cup medal following a narrow 4–3 to 3–5 defeat of Leinster.

Coaching career
In retirement from playing Kennefick became involved in team management and coaching. In 1974 he was coach of the St Finbarr's senior hurling team that qualified for the senior club championship decider. A 2–17 to 2–14 defeat of Blackrock gave "the Barr's" their first title in six years. Kennefick's side later secured the Munster title following a 0–7 to 0–3 victory over Newmarket-on-Fergus. The subsequent All-Ireland decider saw St Finbarr's face Kilkenny and Leinster champions Fenians. A 3–8 to 1–6 victory gave St Finbarr's their first All-Ireland title.

Honours

As a player
St Finbarr's
Cork Minor Club Hurling Championship (3): 1939, 1940, 1941
Cork Senior Club Hurling Championship (2): 1942, 1943

Cork
All-Ireland Senior Hurling Championship (2): 1942, 1943 (c)
Munster Senior Hurling Championship (3): 1942, 1943 (c), 1944
All-Ireland Minor Hurling Championship (1): 1941
Munster Minor Hurling Championship (1): 1941

Munster
Railway Cup (1): 1943

As a coach
St Finbarr's
All-Ireland Senior Club Hurling Championship (1): 1975
Munster Senior Club Hurling Championship (1): 1974
Cork Senior Club Hurling Championship (1): 1974

References

 

1924 births
1984 deaths
St Finbarr's hurlers
Cork inter-county hurlers
Munster inter-provincial hurlers
All-Ireland Senior Hurling Championship winners
People educated at North Monastery
Heads of schools in Ireland
Hurling coaches
Hurling selectors